Casuarina Football Club is an Australian soccer club based in Casuarina, the Northern Territory. Casuarina was established in 1977, currently competes in the NorZone Premier League.

References

External links 
 Casuarina Football Club Official Website
 Casuarina FC FFNT Official Webpage

Soccer clubs in the Northern Territory
1977 establishments in Australia
Association football clubs established in 1977